Gabrovnitsa Air Base or 2nd Fighter Air Base  is a former Bulgarian Air Force air base. It was built outside Gabrovnitsa near Montana in north western Bulgaria. The base was home to the 11th FAR, then the 2nd Sqn of the 18th FAR, 1st Air Defence Division. It closed in 1998 and was demolished.

See also 
 List of Bulgarian Air Force Bases
 List of airports in Bulgaria
 List of Bulgarian military bases
 28th Air Detachment

References

Airports in Bulgaria
Military installations of Bulgaria
Bulgarian Air Force